Landaff Watson Andrews (February 12, 1803 – December 23, 1888) was a United States Representative from Kentucky.

Biography
Born in Flemingsburg, Kentucky, Andrews graduated from the law department of Transylvania University, Lexington, Kentucky, in 1826 and was admitted to the bar the same year. Andrews commenced practice in Flemingsburg, Kentucky. He was also a slave owner.

Andrews was the prosecuting attorney of Fleming County, Kentucky, 1829–1839, and a member of the Kentucky House of Representatives, 1834–1838. He was elected as a Whig to the Twenty-sixth and Twenty-seventh Congresses (March 4, 1839 – March 3, 1843) but was an unsuccessful candidate for reelection in 1842 to the Twenty-eighth Congress. After leaving Congress, he served in the Kentucky Senate as an independent candidate in 1857 and was again elected a member of the Kentucky House of Representatives, in 1861, and served until 1862, when he resigned.

After leaving the state legislature, Andrews was the judge of the circuit court, 1862–1868. He resumed the practice of law in Flemingsburg, Kentucky where he died in 1888. His year of death is often given erroneously as 1887. He was buried in Fleming County Cemetery.

References

1803 births
1888 deaths
People from Flemingsburg, Kentucky
American people of Scottish descent
Whig Party members of the United States House of Representatives from Kentucky
Kentucky Independents
Members of the Kentucky House of Representatives
Kentucky state senators
Kentucky lawyers
Transylvania University alumni
19th-century American lawyers